Gliński is a Polish coat of arms. It was used by several szlachta families in the time of the Polish–Lithuanian Commonwealth.

History

Blazon

Notable bearers
Notable bearers of this coat of arms include:
 Michał Gliński

See also
 Polish heraldry
 Mamay
 List of Polish nobility coats of arms

Polish coats of arms
Ukrainian coats of arms